John Joseph McCabe (March 13, 1954 - September 27, 1969) was a youth from Tewksbury, Massachusetts who was abducted and murdered after attending a Knights of Columbus dance in Lowell, Massachusetts. His bound and strangled body was found in an empty lot on Maple Street in Lowell the next day. His murder remained unsolved for 41 years until April 2011 when three men were arrested for his murder. The case was covered in a 48 Hours episode titled "The Pact". On February 20, 2014, Walter Shelley, 62, of Tewksbury was sentenced in Lowell Superior Court to life in prison for the murder of John J. McCabe.

References 

1954 births
1969 deaths
People from Tewksbury, Massachusetts
People murdered in Massachusetts